The Martin KF-1 was an American biplane fighter aircraft designed and built by Captain James V. Martin.

Development
The KF-1 started as a proposed "high-altitude fighter" designated K-3. Powered by an ABC Gnat the K-3 first flew in May 1918, and was delivered to McCook Field the next month. The model was not ordered for production.

In 1921 Martin submitted an improved version with a larger engine and wider wings. The Navy ordered three, designated K-IV, then later KF-1. The version featured a central float and outriggers.

Variants
 J.V. Martin K.III Kitten the 45 hp prototype the KF-1 is based on.

Specifications (KF-1)

See also

Notes

Bibliography

External links
Martin Kitten K-III museum record at Smithsonian NASM
Aviation History March 1996 issue article

1910s United States fighter aircraft
Aircraft first flown in 1918